Pasma (from Spanish espasmo) refers to a "folk illness" unique to the Filipino culture that is said to be most commonly brought about by exposure of "cold" and water in many forms: water is believed to facilitate the unhealthy coldness that enters the body in the Filipino culture. There are distinct signs, symptoms, perceived causes and treatments which are recognized in the folk medicine of the Philippines, but these are not described in medical textbooks, discussed in medical schools, or generally recognized by contemporary medical science. Although, these symptoms have been perceived and testified as verifiable by Filipinos who have experienced sickness after a long hard day of work and abruptly taking a cold shower. 

University of the Philippines anthropologist Michael Tan points out:
I've been lecturing in several medical schools for several years now and I keep urging health professionals to be more inquisitive about these illnesses because even if these are not recognized by mainstream medicine, the ailments are very real as far as people are concerned, causing suffering and may even be cited as the cause of death, as in the case of "bangungot."

Alongside numerous diseases recognized by Filipino folk medicine, pasma is attributed to an interaction of "init" (heat) and "lamig" (cold). Under certain conditions, the body's muscles (kalamnan) are said to be "hot" and should not be too quickly brought into contact with "cold," in this case usually meaning cold water or air conditioner.

Symptoms and causes
The most common symptoms of pasma are hand tremors, sweaty palms, numbness and pains. "Pasma" is thus very different from the Spanish term from which it takes its root: espasmo, which means "spasm."

Aside from the traditional cause of "init" and "lamig," which is a traditional concept sufficiently intact in the contemporary Philippine psyche to be accepted, alone as a cause for pasma, some correlation has been noted with diseases already recognized by contemporary medicine. For example, symptoms of pasma are similar to those found in people with diabetes mellitus
and thyroid dysfunction. It has also been suggested that the complaints are often neurological in nature and may be linked to some kind of nervous dysfunction. There are several ways that a person is believed to be able to prevent Pasma. These include avoiding tiresome, repetitive movements of the upper extremities, showering and bathing in the morning, and avoiding washing clothes after ironing. Folkloric treatments for Pasma include massages using ginger, coconut oil, alcohol, garlic, and camphor oil. Soaking in lukewarm salted water or rice water is believed to cure Pasma, as well is Pasmang-bituka, a daily salted decoction of solasi (Holy basil).

See also
Bangungot
Usog

References

http://blueknyght-pasma.blogspot.com
https://books.google.com/books?id=EktzHrfup1UC

Culture-bound syndromes
Health in the Philippines
Tagalog words and phrases
Superstitions of the Philippines